"Flipside" is a song by American power pop band the Click Five. It was released in May 2008 as the last and digital download-only single for South-East Asia from their second studio album Modern Minds and Pastimes (2007).

Chart performance

References

External links
The Click Five official website

2008 singles
The Click Five songs
Songs written by Kristian Lundin
Songs written by Carl Falk
Songs written by Ben Romans
2007 songs
Lava Records singles